The Chicagoan was an American magazine modeled after The New Yorker published from June 1926 until April 1935. Focusing on the cultural life of the city of Chicago, each issue of The Chicagoan contained art, music, and drama reviews, profiles of personalities and institutions, commentaries on the local scene, and editorials, along with cartoons and original art.

In an early issue, The Chicagoans editors claimed to represent "a cultural, civilized and vibrant" city "which needs make no obeisance to Park Avenue, Mayfair, or the Champs Elysees." Despite its lofty aims, the stalwart assertions of publisher Martin J. Quigley (who once wrote that "Whatever Chicago was and was to be, The Chicagoan must be and become"), and a circulation that sometimes rose above 20,000, the magazine was largely forgotten after its last issue.

Only two substantial collections remain, one at the University of Chicago's Regenstein Library and the other at the New York Public Library. Cultural historian Neil Harris has written a book on the subject, The Chicagoan: A Lost Magazine of the Jazz Age (the University of Chicago Press).

Authors 
Marie Armstrong Hecht (1892–?). First editor of The Chicagoan, a writer and literary critic. Married to journalist-author Ben Hecht from 1915 to 1925. Marie Hecht published several volumes of poetry in the 1920s and created or adapted some Broadway plays in the 1920s and 1930s. Under a later married name, Marie Essipoff, she produced a number of books in the 1950s emphasizing economical cooking with new techniques, including Making the Most of Your Food Freezer.

Richard Atwater, "Riq" (1892–1948). Born in Chicago as Frederick Mund Atwater, he attended the University of Chicago, where he wrote for the student newspaper and later taught Classical Greek. He went on to work for various local newspapers, including the Chicago Daily News, the Chicago Tribune, and the Herald-Examiner. With his wife, Florence Atwater, in 1938 he coauthored Mr. Popper's Penguins, which won the Newbery Medal.

Artists 
E. Simms Campbell (1908–71). The first African American cartoonist with a national reputation, Campbell was born in St. Louis and graduated from Englewood High School in Chicago. He attended the School of the Art Institute of Chicago between 1924 and 1926 and later he moved to New York, where he was employed as a cartoonist at the Daily Mirror. He did important illustrations for some African American publications, including Crisis and Opportunity, but was better known for his color cartoons in Esquire. He would later work for a string of national advertisers and for Playboy.

Albert Carreno (1905–64). This Mexican-born caricaturist and cartoonist portrayed stage and sports personalities for The Chicagoan in the late 1920s while working for the Chicago Daily News. He then moved to New York and was employed by a series of publishers and comic-book producers including Fawcett, National, and Marvel.

Nat Karson (1908–54). Born in Switzerland, he attended Chicago public schools and the School of the Art Institute of Chicago and increasingly concentrated his efforts on theatrical caricature. After he moved to New York, his theatrical designs and productions attracted wide attention; he created both sets and costumes with the Federal Theater Project and with Orson Welles.

A. Raymond Katz (1895–1974), aka Sandor. Born in Hungary, Katz attended both the School of the Art Institute of Chicago and the Chicago Academy of Fine Arts. He created car cards, posters, and other commercial art before becoming the featured artist of The Chicagoan.

Isadore Klein (1897–1986). Magazine cartoonist, animator, sketcher, painter, and story writer, Klein worked for The New Yorker as well as for The Chicagoan and was involved with a series of famous studios and celebrated cartoons, from Krazy Kat and Betty Boop to Popeye. He was widely credited with originating the idea for Mighty Mouse.

Boris Riedel (no dates available). Creator of The Chicagoans first cover, Riedel served for a while as the magazine's art editor. He illustrated a book of poetry by Marie Hecht, a novel by J. V. Nicholson, and a children's book, The Timid Giant, written by advertising executive Earle Ludgin. Riedel also created movie posters for films starring Clara Bow, Lon Chaney Sr., and Adolphe Menjou, and contributed to The Linebook, a publication put out for WGN Radio, a Tribune Company outlet in Chicago.

Resurrection 
J. C. Gabel, former publisher of Stop Smiling, acquired the rights to the magazine and planned to launch the restored magazine in September, 2011 as a biannual publication with weekly Website updates.  Jessa Crispin has signed on as a contributor and fiction editor. It launched in 2012.  However, Gabel discontinued publishing it after just one, 194-page issue.  Gabel told Crain's Chicago Business in 2015 that "We only did one issue of our incarnation of the Chicagoan, and after a very valiant effort, we couldn't raise the necessary capital to do it properly without it being run like a sweat shop."

Yet another resurrection of a magazine called The Chicagoan was proposed in 2015, by former U.S. Senate candidate Jack Ryan.  However, before he began publishing the magazine, he changed its name to Chicagoly.  That magazine published nine issues before discontinuing publication with the issue published in December 2017.

References

External links 
 Digitized version of The Chicagoan at the University of Chicago Library
 Gallery of covers and other illustrations from the Chicagoan
 Sample pages from The Chicagoan:A Lost Magazine of the Jazz Age by Neil Harris
 An interview with Neil Harris about the Chicagoan

Defunct literary magazines published in the United States
Defunct political magazines published in the United States
Local interest magazines published in the United States
Magazines established in 1926
Magazines disestablished in 1935
Magazines published in Chicago
Modern liberal magazines published in the United States
Works about Chicago